Micrixys is a genus of beetles in the family Carabidae, containing the following species:

 Micrixys distincta (Haldeman, 1852)
 Micrixys mexicana VanDyke, 1927

References

Panagaeinae